Ruby may refer to the following communities in Mississippi:
Ruby, Copiah County, Mississippi
Ruby, Leflore County, Mississippi